Tom Flanigan may refer to:
 Tom Flanigan (writer), American actor, writer and comedian
 Tom Flanigan (baseball), American baseball player
 Tom Flanigan (politician), member of the Missouri House of Representatives

See also
 Thomas Flanagan (disambiguation)
 Tommy Flannigan, Scottish footballer